The Community of St. Mary (CSM) is an Anglican religious order of nuns with independent houses located in Greenwich, New York, Sewanee, Tennessee, Mukwonago, Wisconsin, and also in Malawi and the Philippines.

History
The oldest indigenous Anglican (Epicopalian) order in the United States, it was founded in New York City in 1865 by Harriet Starr Cannon and a small group of fellow nuns.  It was formally constituted by Bishop Horatio Potter of New York as the Sisters of St. Mary.  The Episcopal Church was initially slow to recognize the order, and they only found wide support after four of the sisters died nursing victims of a yellow fever epidemic in Memphis, Tennessee in 1878.  These four sisters are now commemorated by the Episcopal Church on September 9 as the Martyrs of Memphis or as Constance and her Companions.  The community now consists of three independent provinces: Eastern, Western, and Southern. In April of 2021, the Eastern province left the Episcopal Church (TEC) and joined the Anglican Church of North America's Diocese of the Living Word.

Rule of life
Their rule of life is very similar to the Benedictine rule, and they live a mixed life of prayer and service.  The sisters in the Eastern Province pray the Divine Office five times each day, and the community's Monastic Diurnal Revised  is a popular prayer book for many outside of the community as well. From their foundation in 1865 the first sisters took charge of the "House of Mercy" in New York. Then and now the sisters have felt called to the care of "the lost, forgotten, and underprivileged" after the example of many Christian saints, including St Vincent de Paul.

Provinces

Eastern
The Eastern Province sisters moved in 2003 from Peekskill, New York to Greenwich, New York, where they own a  facility adjoining the Spiritual Life Center of the Episcopal Diocese of Albany.    The sisters engage in various activities, which include participating at the healing center of the Spiritual Life Center, giving retreats, working with a local Boy Scout troop, and speaking at various churches.  They also raise cashmere goats and run a 4-H program for local youth. They continue to wear the traditional habit.

Southern
The Southern Province sisters trace their descent from the remnants of the Memphis sisters.  Their current chapel houses the altar, aumbry, and chalice that were originally located in the Memphis house.  The sisters formerly operated a girls' school in Sewanee—St. Mary's Preparatory School for Girls—which closed at the end of the 1967-1968 school year.  The school is now a retreat center for individual and group retreats, in addition to hosting presentations on contemplative prayer.  The convent and the retreat center are located near the campus of the Sewanee: The University of the South.  The sisters say the office from the 1979 Book of Common Prayer, in addition to a daily mass, every day except Monday, which is the sisters' Sabbath.

Western
The Western Province sisters pursue individual ministries, but are especially involved in offering retreats and spiritual direction at Mary's Margin in Mukwonago, Wisconsin.

Overseas houses

Malawi
A branch house of the Eastern Province of the Order was established in Malawi in 2002.  The initial group of Malawian sisters completed their novitiate at the American house, but now they have enough professed sisters to train novices in Malawi.  They are hoping to establish a crisis nursery for babies whose parents are unable to care for them because of AIDS.  They also give presentations in churches, visit the sick, lead Bible studies, preach, and work on their farm, helping other women to learn sustainable agriculture techniques.

Philippines
The sisters also have a mission in the Philippines, which has been in existence for over thirty years, and forms part of the Southern Province.

St Mary's Convent is located in the predominantly Anglican town of Sagada, Mountain Province. It is attached to the Church of Saint Mary the Virgin, which belongs to the Episcopal Church in the Philippines.

References

Ten Decades of Praise: The Story of the Community of Saint Mary During its First Century (1865-1965) by Sister Mary Hilary, CSM. Dekoven Foundation: 1965. available online
The Hidden Life PBS documentary on the Community of Saint Mary (copies available from the convent; see Website of the Community of Saint Mary, below)
Anglican Religious Communities Yearbook:  2006-2007.  Norwich:  Canterbury Press, 2005.

External links
Website of the Eastern Province, CSM (and Malawi).
Website of the Southern Province, CSM (and Philippines).
Online resources pertaining to the CSM from Project Canterbury.
Documents on the Martyrs of Memphis
The Rule of the Community of Saint Mary: A Study in Development by the Reverend Dr. Terrence Gleeson 2002
The Ayres Center for Spiritual Development - St. Mary's Sewanee
Faithfulness and Success, 2014 interview by Richard Mammana with Mother Miriam CSM from The Living Church.

Anglican orders and communities
Religious organizations established in 1865
Christian religious orders established in the 19th century
1865 establishments in New York (state)